Uthpala Chakraborty is a former Test cricketer who represented India. Her sister Sharmila Chakraborty is also a former Indian Test cricketer.

References

Delhi women cricketers
India women Test cricketers
Indian women cricketers
Living people
Cricketers from Delhi
Year of birth missing (living people)